Chris Rorke is an American football coach and former player. He currently serves as the head football coach at Tabor Academy in Marion, Massachusetts. Rorke was the head football coach at Plymouth State University in Plymouth, New Hampshire from 1999 to 2002, compiling a record of 20–21. He played quarterback at Dartmouth College, where he lettered in 1987 and 1988.

Head coaching record

College

References

Year of birth missing (living people)
Living people
American football quarterbacks
Dartmouth Big Green football coaches
Dartmouth Big Green football players
Georgia Tech Yellow Jackets football coaches
Illinois Wesleyan Titans football coaches
Lehigh Mountain Hawks football coaches
Plymouth State Panthers football coaches
Trinity Bantams football coaches
High school football coaches in Massachusetts
People from North Andover, Massachusetts
Players of American football from Massachusetts
Sportspeople from Essex County, Massachusetts